Herbert is an unincorporated community in Boone County, Illinois, United States. Herbert is south of Belvidere and northwest of Genoa.

History
A post office called Herbert has been in operation since 1886. The community was named for the son of a settler.

References

Unincorporated communities in Boone County, Illinois
Unincorporated communities in Illinois
1886 establishments in Illinois